Place Vendôme is a 1998 French crime drama film directed by Nicole Garcia, starring Catherine Deneuve, and named after the Place Vendôme in Paris.

Deneuve won the Volpi Cup for Best Actress at the 55th Venice International Film Festival for her role in the film.

Plot
Vincent Malivert is the head of a prestigious jewel broker's firm on the exclusive Place Vendôme. Hampered by debt and implicated in trafficking of stolen jewels, he commits suicide, leaving his wife Marianne to pick up the pieces. 

Marianne, who has spent the last few years in and out of a clinic recovering from alcoholism, discovers a set of perfect cut diamonds in her husband's safe. Although she knows the diamonds are probably stolen, she decides to use this opportunity to rebuild her life and sets about trying to find a buyer for the hidden jewels. Unwittingly, she is drawn to a shady dealer named Battistelli, the very man who drove her into a disastrous and loveless marriage.

Cast

Catherine Deneuve as Marianne Malivert
Jean-Pierre Bacri as Jean-Pierre
Emmanuelle Seigner as Nathalie
Jacques Dutronc as Serge Battistelli
Bernard Fresson as Vincent Malivert
François Berléand as Eric Malivert
Dragan Nikolić as Janos
Larry Lamb as Christopher Makos
Otto Tausig as Samy 
László Szabó as Charlie Rosen 
Elisabeth Commelin as Mademoiselle Pierson 
Philippe Clévenot as Kleiser 
Malik Zidi as Sam's Son 
Éric Ruf as Phillipe Ternece
Nidal Al-Askhar as Saliha
Julian Fellowes as Wajman 
Michael Culkin as De Beers Man

Reception and critical response
On review aggregator Rotten Tomatoes, Place Vendôme holds an approval rating of 85%, based on 20 reviews, and an average rating of 6.6/10. On Metacritic, the film has a weighted average score of 74 out of 100, based on 18 critics, indicating "Generally favorable reviews".

In the New York Times, David Kehr wrote, "despite its many flaws, the film never loses its focus on its fascinating central figure. Grandly suffering, grandly triumphant or just plain grand, Ms. Deneuve is a spectacle to behold." Lisa Nesselson of the Variety Magazine said that the film is "an elaborate and elegant suspenser that gives Catherine Deneuve plenty of leeway to act up a storm, "Place Vendome" features coveted gemstones, the no-nonsense factions that want them and a woman's revised take on her own destiny, played out against luxurious backdrops".

Roger Ebert gave the film a score of 3.5 out of 5.

References

External links

Films set in Paris
Films directed by Nicole Garcia
Films shot in Antwerp
Films shot in Paris
Films produced by Alain Sarde
French crime drama films
1998 crime drama films
1998 films
1990s French-language films
1990s French films